Vivienne Traynor (born 1971) is an Irish journalist and presenter with Raidió Teilifís Éireann (RTÉ), where she has been a relief presenter for the One O'Clock News and Six One News. She is the courts reporter for RTÉ.

Personal life
Traynor is from Skerries, Dublin. She is married to sports anchor Justin Treacy and has 4 children. In 2009, she donated a kidney to her nephew, something she discussed in an October 2009 interview on The Late Late Show. On 14 June 2013, she won a Justice Media Award in the 'Court Reporting for Broadcast Media' category for her work on the Marie Fleming assisted suicide case.

References

1970s births
Living people
Organ transplant donors
People from Fingal
RTÉ newsreaders and journalists
Irish women radio presenters
Irish women journalists
Women television journalists
Women radio journalists
Alumni of the National College of Ireland
Alumni of Dublin Institute of Technology